The 2022 Atlanta United FC season will be the sixth season of Atlanta United FC's existence, and the fourteenth year that a professional soccer club from Atlanta, Georgia competing in the top division of American soccer. Atlanta United will play their home games at Mercedes-Benz Stadium. Outside of MLS, they will participate in the 2022 U.S. Open Cup as defending champions, as the 2020 and 2021 editions of tournament were canceled due to the ongoing COVID-19 pandemic.

Club

Results

Non-competitive

Preseason exhibitions

American Family Insurance Cup

Competitive

Major League Soccer Regular Season

U.S. Open Cup

Player movement

In

Out

Loan Out

Non-player transfers

References

Atlanta United FC seasons
Atlanta United
Atlanta United
Atlanta United FC